Bělá nad Svitavou is a municipality and village in Svitavy District in the Pardubice Region of the Czech Republic. It has about 500 inhabitants.

Notable people
Jakob Kolletschka (1803–1847), Czech-Austrian pathologist and forensic physician

References

Villages in Svitavy District